In the 2012–13 season, MC Alger competed in the Ligue 1 for the 42nd season, as well as the Algerian Cup. It was their 10th consecutive season in the top flight of Algerian football.

Squad list
Players and squad numbers last updated on 18 November 2010.Note: Flags indicate national team as has been defined under FIFA eligibility rules. Players may hold more than one non-FIFA nationality.

Pre-season and friendlies

Competitions

Overview

{| class="wikitable" style="text-align: center"
|-
!rowspan=2|Competition
!colspan=8|Record
!rowspan=2|Started round
!rowspan=2|Final position / round
!rowspan=2|First match	
!rowspan=2|Last match
|-
!
!
!
!
!
!
!
!
|-
| Ligue 1

|  
| 5th
| 15 September 2012
| 21 May 2013
|-
| Algerian Cup

| Round of 64 
| style="background:silver;"| Runners-up
| 15 December 2012
| 1 May 2013
|-
! Total

Ligue 1

League table

Results summary

Results by round

Matches

Algerian Cup

Squad information

Playing statistics

|-

|-
! colspan=10 style=background:#dcdcdc; text-align:center| Players transferred out during the season

Goalscorers

Transfers

In

Out

Notes

References

External links
 2012–13 MC Alger season at dzfoot.com 

MC Alger seasons
Algerian football clubs 2012–13 season